The following article is a summary of the 2010 football season in Kenya, the 47th competitive season in its history.

Domestic leagues

Promotion and relegation

Promoted to Premier League
 Mahakama
 Posta Rangers

Relegated from Premier League
 Agrochemical
 Bandari

Premier League

The 2010 Kenyan Premier League began on 20 February 2010 and ended on 14 November, 2010.

Relegation
Red Berets and Mahakama, were relegated to the Nationwide League for the following season, but the former disbanded due to immense pressure from its sponsors to produce good performances.

Nationwide League
At the end of the 2010 season, Bandari and Congo JMJ United gained promotion to the Premier League for the following season.

Domestic cups

FKL Cup
Sofapaka beat West Kenya Sugar 2–0 in the final to lift the title for the second time their history.

Super Cup

The 2010 Kenyan Super Cup match was played on January 31, 2010, between Sofapaka, the 2009 Kenyan Premier League champions, and A.F.C. Leopards, who clinched their 8th FKL Cup title the same year. Sofapaka won 1−0 at full-time.

International club competitions

Champions League

The 2010 CAF Champions League began on February 12, 2010, and finished on November 13, 2010. Sofapaka qualified for participation in the tournament as 2009 Kenyan Premier League champions. They were knocked out on aggregate in the preliminary round by Ismaily, who advanced to the first round.

Confederation Cup

The 2012 CAF Confederation Cup began in February 2010 and ended in November 2010. A.F.C Leopards qualified for participation in the tournament as 2009 FKL Cup champions. They were knocked out on aggregate in the preliminary round by Banks, who advanced to the first round.

National team

Africa Cup of Nations

The national team participated in the qualification phase of the 2012 Africa Cup of Nations. They finished third in their group and missed out on the final tournament.

CECAFA Cup

Kenya participated in the 2010 CECAFA Cup, but were knocked out in the group stages, finishing last in their group with no points.

Other matches
The following is a list of all other matches played by Kenya in 2010.

References

External links
Kenyan Premier League
Futaa - Kenyan Football Portal
KenyaFootball
African Cup of Nations 2012 - Qualifiers
FIFA.com - Kenya fixtures and results